Daphne Anderson (née Scrutton; 27 April 1922 – 15 January 2013) was an English stage, film, and television actress, as well as a dancer and singer. She made her London theatre debut in 1938 at the Windmill Theatre. Anderson appeared in such films as The Beggar's Opera, Hobson's Choice and The Scarlet Pimpernel.

Biography
Anderson was born on 27 April 1922, in London, to parents Alan Edward Scrutton and Gladys Amy Scrutton (née Juler). Her surname was originally "Scrutton", but she later changed it to "Anderson". Anderson attended Kensington High School. She married Lionel William Carter. Her aunt was the composer Mary Anderson Lucas.

Theatrical career
Daphne Anderson studied dancing under Zelia Raye. She made her first stage performance in 1937 at the Richmond Theatre as a chorus member in a production of Cinderella. The following year, Anderson made her London theatre debut in the chorus of the Revudeville at the Windmill Theatre.

She played several roles in various theatrical productions of Lewis Carroll's Alice's Adventures in Wonderland. In 1943, she played Father William in a production of Alice in Wonderland and the Walrus in Alice Through the Looking-Glass, both at the Scala Theatre in London. She was a prominent member of Leonard Sachs' Players Theatre Company in London, appearing regularly at the Charing Cross Villiers Street venue and featured on recordings made there.  In 1951 she appeared at the Princes Theatre in The Seventh Veil.

In 1972, she assumed the role of the Red Queen in Alice Through the Looking-Glass at the Ashcroft Theatre.

Film and television
Anderson appeared in the following films:
Trottie True (1949) - Bertha True
The Dark Man (1951) - Fisherwoman
 Castigo Implacável (1951) - KateThe Beggar's Opera (1953) - Lucy LockitLaughing Anne (1953) - Blonde SingerHobson's Choice (1954) - Alice HobsonA Kid for Two Farthings (1955) - DoraThe Prince and the Showgirl (1957) - FannyNo Time for Tears (1957) - Dr. Marian CornishSnowball (1960) - Nora HartPersuasion (1960, TV Series) - Mrs. ClayStork Talk (1962) - Dr. Mary WillisCaptain Clegg (1962) - Mrs. RashBitter Harvest (1963) - Mrs. MedwinThe Flood (1963) - Mrs. WeathersfieldGideon's Way (1964-1966, TV Series) - Kate GideonThe Whitehall Worrier (1967, TV Series) - Mrs. NicholsonI Want What I Want (1972)Au Pair Girls (1972) - Mrs. HowardMinder (1979, Episode: "Come in T-64, Your Time Is Ticking Away") - KatieThe Scarlet Pimpernel (1982, TV Movie) - Lady GrenvilleReal Life (1984) - Morality Lady

Anderson also appeared on television programmes including Thomas and Sarah and a television adaptation of The Old Curiosity Shop. In 1985, Anderson appeared in an episode of British sitcom In Sickness and in Health. She may be best remembered as Kate Gideon in the 1965 ITC series Gideon's Way''.

Death
Daphne Anderson died on 15 January 2013, at the age of 90.

References

External links

Obituary, thestage.co.uk

1922 births
2013 deaths
Actresses from London
English film actresses
English stage actresses
English television actresses
20th-century British businesspeople